Bye Bye Morons is a 2020 French comedy drama film written and directed by Albert Dupontel. The film stars Virginie Efira, Albert Dupontel and Nicolas Marié.

The film received twelve nominations at the 46th César Awards, winning in six categories, including Best Film, Best Director and Best Original Screenplay for Dupontel, and Best Supporting Actor for Marié.

Synopsis 
Once salon owner Suze Trappet is diagnosed with a terminal illness, she decides to find the child she was forced to abandon when she was 15 years old. Her journey will lead her to cross paths with JB, a fifty-something in full burn-out, and Mr. Blin, a blind archivist of impressive enthusiasm.

Cast
 Virginie Efira as Suze Trappet
 Albert Dupontel as Jean-Baptiste Cuchas
 Nicolas Marié as Serge Blin
 Jackie Berroyer as Dr Lint
  as M. Kurtzman
  as Adrien
  as Clara
 Michel Vuillermoz as The psy
 Laurent Stocker as M. Tuttle
 Kyan Khojandi as Dr Lint's doctor
 Bouli Lanners as Suze's doctor
 Terry Gilliam as The hunter

Release
The film was released on October 21, 2020 in France.

Awards and nominations 

|-
| align = "center" rowspan = "12" | 2021 || rowspan = "12" | César Awards || colspan = "2" | Best Film ||  || rowspan = "12" | 
|-
| Best Director || Albert Dupontel || 
|-
| Best Actress || Virginie Efira || 
|-
| Best Actor || Albert Dupontel || 
|-
| Best Supporting Actor || Nicolas Mairé || 
|-
| Best Original Screenplay || Albert Dupontel || 
|-
| Best Cinematography || Alexis Kavyrchine || 
|-
| Best Editing || Christophe Pinel || 
|-
| Best Costume Design || Mimi Lempicka || 
|-
| Best Production Design || Carlos Conti || 
|-
| Best Original Music || Christophe Julien || 
|-
| Best Sound || Jean Minondo, Gurwal Coïc-Gallas, Cyril Holtz || 
|-
| align = "center" rowspan = "2" | 2022 || Goya Awards || colspan = "2" | Best European Film ||  || 
|-
| Magritte Awards || Best Actress || Virginie Efira ||  || 
|}

References

External links

2020 comedy-drama films
French comedy-drama films
Films directed by Albert Dupontel
Best Film César Award winners
2020s French-language films
2020s French films